Zhang Wei (born 7 November 1956) is a Chinese author. He was born in Longkou, Yantai, which is located in the north of the Shandong Peninsula. He graduated from the Chinese Department at Yantai Normal College in 1980. Three years later, he became a member of China Writers Association, an organization for which he has served as chairman and deputy chairman of the Shandong branch. He is best known for his novels The Ancient Ship and September's Fable. In 2011 Zhang won the Mao Dun Literature Prize, the highest national literary award, for On the Plateau, a 10-volume work that took a decade to write.

Works
The Ancient Ship 《古船》(1987)
September's Fable 《九月寓言》(2007)
Seven Kinds of Mushrooms 《蘑菇七种》 (2009)
On the Plateau 《你在高原》(2011)
Songs from the Forest《刺猬歌》(2020)

Children's books 
(The English titles are approximate)
Life on the Peninsula 《半岛哈里哈气》(2012)
The Young Boy and the Sea 《少年与海》(2017)
Looking for the King of Fish 《寻找鱼王》

References

External links 
 September's Fable
 Zhang Wei on Paper Republic

Living people
1956 births
Writers from Yantai
People from Longkou
Mao Dun Literature Prize laureates
Chinese male novelists
People's Republic of China novelists
Chinese children's writers